The 2013 Johan Cruyff Shield was the eighteenth edition of the Johan Cruyff Shield, an annual Dutch football match played between the winners of the previous season's Eredivisie and KNVB Cup. The match was contested by AZ, the 2012–13 KNVB Cup winners, and Ajax, champions of the 2012–13 Eredivisie. It was held at the Amsterdam Arena on 27 July 2013. Ajax won the match 3–2 after extra time.

Match details

Match officials:
Assistant referees:
Dave Goossens
Hessel Steegstra
Fourth official:
Dennis Higler

References

 

2013
Joh
J
J
Johan Cruyff Shield